The Type 94 Disinfecting Vehicle and Type 94 Gas Scattering Vehicle were variants of the Type 94 tankette adapted to chemical warfare by the Imperial Japanese Army. The Type 94 Disinfecting Vehicle and Type 94 Gas Scattering Vehicle were configured as an independent mobile liquid dissemination chemical vehicle with respective mobile disinfecting anti-chemical agents vehicle for support to Japanese chemical infantry units in combat.

Operation 
These special vehicles for chemical warfare were developed in 1933–1934. The Type 94 tankette was modified and used as a "tractor"; closed for protection against these agents. It would pull either a configured independent tracked mobile liquid dissemination chemical vehicle or a respective tracked mobile disinfecting anti-chemical agents vehicle.

The Gas Scattering Vehicle version could scatter mustard gas chemical agent with an 8m width and the Disinfecting Vehicle version scattered "bleaching powder to counteract the poison gas" or pathogenic agents.

In a similar way, the Soviet Red Army developed chemical/biological warfare special protection armored vehicles, including the use of medium or light tanks with modified turrets with dispersers or gas scatterers, liquid or powder dissemination systems and special armor protection against agents for their respective chemical/biological units in the years prior to and during World War II. One example of this was the chemical/flame tank versions of the T-26. Other major powers also had their own versions of vehicles designed to deliver chemical and/or biological weapons on the battlefield, usually using light or infantry tanks as their basis.

Also produced for the Imperial Japanese Army were the Type 97 Disinfecting Vehicle and Type 97 Gas Scattering Vehicle. They were based on the Type 97 Te-Ke tankette chassis, but had a Type 94 turret. They operated in the same way as the Type 94 tankette based versions. The liquid dissemination chemical vehicle trailer or tracked mobile disinfecting anti-chemical agents vehicle trailer that were towed, were the same used with the Type 94 versions.

See also 
 Teletank

Notes

References

Imperial Japanese Army
Chemical warfare
Chemical weapon delivery systems
Japanese biological weapons program
Tankettes of Japan
History of the tank
Mitsubishi
Military vehicles introduced in the 1930s